Ventsislav Kerchev (Bulgarian: Венцислав Керчев; born 2 June 1997) is a Bulgarian professional footballer who plays as a defender for Slavia Sofia.

Career

Early career
Born in Ruse, Kerchev began his football career playing for Dunav Ruse at the age of seven. In 2010, he joined Ludogorets's youth setup.

Ludogorets Razgrad
At the start of the 2015–16 season, Kerchev was promoted to the club's reserve team in the B Group, the second level of Bulgarian football. He made his debut on 25 July, in a 3–2 home defeat against Dunav Ruse.

After spending August and the early part of September playing with Ludogorets II, Kerchev was called up to the senior team by manager Eduard Eranosyan. He made his debut in the A Group on 19 September, playing full 90 minutes in the centre of defence against Botev Plovdiv. On 19 March 2016, he scored his first goal in the team's league match against Beroe Stara Zagora at Beroe Stadium. Ludogorets won the match 2–0.

For the 2017-18 season Kerchev returned for club's reserve team from his loan from Lokomotiv GO and started as a captain in the first match for the season on 24 July 2017 against Lokomotiv 1929 Sofia.

On 13 June 2018, Kerchev's contract was extended and he was sent on a season-long loan to Botev Vratsa.

Slavia Sofia
After 3 seasons for Botev in total, Kerchev joined Slavia Sofia on 14 June 2021.

Statistics

Club

Honours
Ludogorets
 Bulgarian League: 2015–16

References

External links

1997 births
Living people
Sportspeople from Ruse, Bulgaria
Bulgarian footballers
Bulgaria youth international footballers
Bulgaria under-21 international footballers
First Professional Football League (Bulgaria) players
Second Professional Football League (Bulgaria) players
PFC Ludogorets Razgrad II players
PFC Ludogorets Razgrad players
FC Lokomotiv Gorna Oryahovitsa players
FC Botev Vratsa players
Association football central defenders